Humility is the quality of being humble. Dictionary definitions accentuate humility as a low self-regard and sense of unworthiness. In a religious context humility can mean a recognition of self in relation to a deity (i.e. God), and subsequent submission to that deity as a member of that religion. Outside of a religious context, humility is defined as being "unselved", a liberation from consciousness of self, a form of temperance that is neither having pride (or haughtiness) nor indulging in self-deprecation.

Humility is an outward expression of an appropriate inner, or self regard, and is contrasted with humiliation which is an imposition, often external, of shame upon a person.  Humility may be misappropriated as ability to suffer humiliation through self-denouncements which in itself remains focused on self rather than low self-focus.

Humility, in various interpretations, is widely seen as a virtue which centers on low self-preoccupation, or unwillingness to put oneself forward, so it is in many religious and philosophical traditions, it contrasts with narcissism, hubris and other forms of pride and is an idealistic and rare intrinsic construct that has an extrinsic side.

Term
See the English humus.

The word "humble" may be related to feudal England where the lowest cuts of meat, or 'umbles',' that is to say whatever was left over when the upper classes had taken their parts, were provided to the lowest class of citizen.

Mythology
Aidos, in Greek mythology, was the daimona (goddess) of shyness, shame, and humility. She was the quality that restrained human beings from wrong.

Religious views of humility

Abrahamic

Judaism

Rabbi Lord Jonathan Sacks states that in Judaism humility is an appreciation of oneself, one's talents, skills, and virtues.  It is not meekness or self-deprecating thought, but the effacing of oneself to something higher.  Humility is not to think lowly of oneself, but to appreciate the self one has received. In recognition of the mysteries and complexities of life, one becomes humbled to the awesomeness of what one is and what one can achieve.  Rabbi Pini Dunner discusses that humility is to place others first; it is to appreciate others' worth as important.  In recognizing our worth as people, Rabbi Dunner shows that looking into the zillions of stars in the sky, and in the length and history of time, you and I are insignificant, like dust. Rabbi Dunner states that Moses wrote in the Torah, "And Moses was exceedingly humble, more than any man on the face of the earth." How is it possible to be humble and write you are the most humble? The conclusion is that Moses knew he was humble. It is not in denial of your talents and gifts but to recognize them and live up to your worth and something greater.  It is in the service to others that is the greatest form of humility.

As illustrated in the person of Moses, who leads the nation of Hebrews out of slavery in Egypt and to the "Promised Land", humility is a sign of Godly strength and purpose, not weakness. Of this great leader, the Bible states, "For Moses was a man exceeding meek above all men that dwelt upon earth".  Moses is venerated by Jewish, Christian and Muslim adherents alike.

Amongst the benefits of humility described in the Hebrew Bible, that is shared by many faiths, are honor, wisdom, prosperity, the protection of the Lord and peace. In addition, "God opposes the proud but gives grace to the humble"

Christianity

Also in Jesus Christ's behavior in general and submission to unjust torture and execution in particular, are held up as examples of righteous humility: "Who, when he was reviled, did not revile: when he suffered, he threatened not: but delivered himself to him that judged him justly.",

C.S. Lewis writes, in Mere Christianity, that pride is the "anti-God" state, the position in which the ego and the self are directly opposed to God: "Unchastity, anger, greed, drunkenness, and all that, are mere fleabites in comparison: it was through Pride that the devil became the devil: Pride leads to every other vice: it is the complete anti-God state of mind." In contrast, Lewis contends that, in Christian moral teaching, the opposite of pride is humility.  This is popularly illustrated by a phrase wrongly attributed to Lewis, "Humility is not thinking less of yourself, but thinking of yourself less." This is an apparent paraphrase, by Rick Warren in "The Purpose Driven Life", of a passage found in Mere Christianity: Lewis writes, regarding the truly humble man, 

St. Augustine stresses the importance of humility in the study of the Bible, with the exemplars of a barbarian Christian slave, the apostle Paul, and the Ethiopian eunuch in Acts 8 (De Doctrina Christiana, prooem. 4–7 [hereafter DDC]).  Both learner and teacher need to be humble, because they learn and teach what ultimately belongs to God (DDC, prooem. 7–8; 1 Cor. 4:7). Humility is a basic disposition of the interpreter of the Bible. The confidence of the exegete and preacher arises from the conviction that his or her mind depends on God absolutely (DDC, 1.1.1). Augustine argues that the interpreter of the Bible should proceed with humility, because only a humble person can grasp the truth of Scripture (DDC, 2.41.62).

Humility is said to be a fit recipient of grace; according to the words of St. James, "God opposes the proud but gives grace to the humble" (.)

"True humility" is distinctly different from "false humility" which consists of deprecating one's own sanctity, gifts, talents, and accomplishments for the sake of receiving praise or adulation from others, as personified by the fictional character Uriah Heep created by Charles Dickens. In this context legitimate humility comprises the following behaviors and attitudes:
Submitting to God and legitimate authority 
Recognizing virtues and talents that others possess, particularly those that surpass one's own, and giving due honor and, when required, obedience
Recognizing the limits of one's talents, ability, or authority.

The vices opposed to humility are: 
Pride
Too great obsequiousness or abjection of oneself; this would be considered an excess of humility, and could easily be derogatory to one's office or holy character; or it might serve only to pamper pride in others, by unworthy flattery, which would occasion their sins of tyranny, arbitrariness, and arrogance. The virtue of humility may not be practiced in any external way that would occasion vices in others.

Catholicism

Catholic texts view humility as annexed to the cardinal virtue of temperance. It is viewed as a potential part of temperance because temperance includes all those virtues that restrain or express the inordinate movements of our desires or appetites.

St. Bernard defines it as, "A virtue by which a man knowing himself as he truly is, abases himself. Jesus Christ is the ultimate definition of Humility."

Humility was a virtue extolled by Saint Francis of Assisi, and this form of Franciscan piety led to the artistic development of the Madonna of humility first used by them for contemplation. The Virgin of humility sits on the ground, or upon a low cushion, unlike the Enthroned Madonna representations. This style of painting spread quickly through Italy and by 1375 examples began to appear in Spain, France and Germany and it became the most popular among the styles of the early Trecento artistic period.

St. Thomas Aquinas, a 13th-century philosopher and theologian in the Scholastic tradition, defines humility similarly as "the virtue of humility" that "consists in keeping oneself within one's own bounds, not reaching out to things above one, but submitting to one's superior" (Summa Contra Gent., bk. IV, ch. lv, tr. Joseph Rickaby).

Islam
In the Qur'an, various Arabic words conveying the meaning of "humility" are used.  The very term "Islam" can be interpreted as "surrender (to God), humility", from the triconsonantal root S-L-M; other words used are tawadu and khoshou:

Eastern

Buddhism

Buddhism is a religion of self-examination. The natural aim of the Buddhist life is the state of enlightenment, gradually cultivated through meditation and other spiritual practices. Humility, in this context, is a characteristic that is both an essential part of the spiritual practice, and a result of it. As a quality to be developed, it is deeply connected with the practice of Four Abodes (Brahmavihara): love-kindness, compassion, empathetic joy and equanimity. As a result of the practice, this cultivated humility is expanded by the wisdom acquired by the experience of ultimate emptiness (Śūnyatā) and non-self (Anatta). Humility, compassion, and wisdom are intrinsic parts of the state of enlightenment. On the other hand, not being humble is an obstacle on the path of enlightenment which needs to be overcome. In the Tipitaka (the Buddhist scriptures), criticizing others and praising oneself is considered a vice; but criticizing oneself and praising others is considered a virtue. Attachment to the self, apart from being a vice in itself, also leads to other evil states, that create suffering.

In the Tipitaka, in the widely known "Mangala Sutta", humility (literally: 'without air') is mentioned as one of the thirty-eight blessings in life. In the Pāli Canon, examples of humility that are often raised are the monk Sariputta Thera, a leading disciple of the Buddha, and Hatthaka, a leading lay disciple. In later Pali texts and Commentaries, Sariputta Thera is depicted as a forgiving person, who is quick to apologize and accepting of criticism. In the suttas (discourses of the Buddha) Hatthaka is praised by the Buddha when he was unwilling to let other people know his good qualities.

In Buddhist practice, humility is practiced in a variety of ways. For example, Japanese Soto Zen monks bow and chant in honor of their robes before they don them. This serves to remind them of the connection of the monk's robes with enlightenment. Buddhist monks in all traditions are dependent on the generosity of laypeople, through whom they receive their necessities. This in itself is a practice of humility.

Hindu Dharma / Sanathana Dharma
Amanitvam is a fusion word for "pridelessness" and the virtue of "humility". Other related concepts are namrata (नम्रता), which means modest and humble behavior.

Different scholars have varying interpretations for the concept of amanitvam, humility, as virtue in the Bhagwad Gita. For example, Prabhupada explains humility to mean one should not be anxious to have the satisfaction of being honored by others. The material conception of life makes us very eager to receive honor from others, but from the point of view of a man in perfect knowledge—who knows that he is not this body—anything, honor or dishonor, pertaining to this body is useless. Jopson explains amanitvam, humility, as lack of arrogance and pride, and one of twenty-six virtues in a human being that if perfected, leads one to a divine state of living and the ultimate truth. Eknath Easwaran writes that the Gita's subject is "the war within, the struggle for self-mastery that every human being must wage if he or she is to emerge from life victorious", and "The language of battle is often found in the scriptures, for it conveys the strenuous, long, drawn-out campaign we must wage to free ourselves from the tyranny of the ego, the cause of all our suffering and sorrow". To get in touch with your true self, whether you call that God, Brahman, etc., one has to let go of the ego.  The Sanskrit word Ahamkara literally translates into The-sound-of-I, or quite simply the sense of the self or ego.

Mahatma Gandhi interprets the concept of humility in Hindu Dharma much more broadly, where humility is an essential virtue that must exist in a person for other virtues to emerge. To Mahatma Gandhi, Truth can be cultivated, as well as Love, but Humility cannot be cultivated. Humility has to be one of the starting points. He states, "Humility cannot be an observance by itself. For it does not lend itself to being practiced. It is however an indispensable test of ahimsa (non-violence)." Humility must not be confused with mere manners; a man may prostrate himself before another, but if his heart is full of bitterness for the other, it is not humility. Sincere humility is how one feels inside, it's a state of mind. A humble person is not himself conscious of his humility, states Mahatma Gandhi.

Swami Vivekananda, one of the scholars of Hindu Dharma in the 19th century, argues that the concept of humility does not mean "crawling on all fours and calling oneself a sinner." In Vivekananda's Hindu Dharma, each human being the Universal, recognizing and feeling oneness with everyone and everything else in the universe, without inferiority or superiority or any other bias, is the mark of humility. To Dr. S Radhakrishnan, humility in Hindu Dharma is the non-judgmental state of mind when we are best able to learn, contemplate and understand everyone and everything else.

Sikhism

Baba Nand Singh Ji Maharaj said about Guru Nanak that Garibi, Nimrata, Humility is the Divine Flavour, the most wonderful fragrance of the Lotus Feet of Lord Guru Nanak. There is no place for Ego (referred to in Sikhism as Haumain) in the sphere of Divine Love, in the sphere of true Prema Bhagti. That is why in the House of Guru Nanak one finds Garibi, Nimrata, Humility reigning supreme. Guru Nanak was an Incarnation of Divine Love and a Prophet of True Humility.

According to Sikhism all people, equally, have to bow before God so there ought to be no hierarchies among or between people.  According to Nanak the supreme purpose of human life is to reconnect with Akal (The Timeless One), however, egotism is the biggest barrier in doing this. Using the guru's teaching remembrance of nām (the divine Word)  leads to the end of egotism.  The immediate fruit of humility is intuitive peace and pleasure. With humility they continue to meditate on the Lord, the treasure of excellence. The God-conscious being is steeped in humility. One whose heart is mercifully blessed with abiding humility. Sikhism treats humility as a begging bowl before the god.

Sikhs extend this belief in equality, and thus humility, towards all faith:  "all religious traditions are equally valid and capable of enlightening their followers". In addition to sharing with others Guru Nanak inspired people to earn an honest living without exploitation and also the need for remembrance of the divine name (God). Guru Nanak described living an "active, creative, and practical life" of "truthfulness, fidelity, self-control and purity" as being higher than a purely contemplative life.

Baba Nand Singh Ji
Baba Nand Singh Sahib is renowned as the most humble Sikh Saint in the history of Sikhism. Once the disciples of Baba Harnam Singh Ji, the spiritual preceptor of Baba Nand Singh Ji Maharaj asked him how much power He had transmitted to Baba Nand Singh Ji Maharaj to which He replied

Baba Nand Singh Ji Maharaj was humbler than the humblest in spirit and He outshines everyone at the pinnacle of all spiritual glory.

Sri Guru Arjan Sahib says in Sukhmani Sahib:

Meher Baba
The spiritual teacher Meher Baba held that humility is one of the foundations of devotional life: "Upon the altar of humility we must offer our prayers to God."  Baba also described the power of humility to overcome hostility: "True humility is strength, not weakness. It disarms antagonism and ultimately conquers it." Finally, Baba emphasized the importance of being humble when serving others: "One of the most difficult things to learn is to render service without bossing, without making a fuss about it and without any consciousness of high and low. In the world of spirituality, humility counts at least as much as utility."

Taoism

Humility, in Taoism, is defined as a refusal to assert authority or a refusal to be first in anything and that the act of daring, in itself, is a refusal of wisdom and a rush to enjoin circumstances before you are ready.  Along with compassion and frugality, humility is one of the three treasures (virtues) in the possession of those who follow the Tao.

The treasure of humility, in Chinese is a six-character phrase instead of a single word:  "not dare to be first/ahead in the world". Ellen Chen notes that:
The third treasure, daring not be at the world's front, is the Taoist way to avoid premature death. To be at the world's front is to expose oneself, to render oneself vulnerable to the world's destructive forces, while to remain behind and to be humble is to allow oneself time to fully ripen and bear fruit. This is a treasure whose secret spring is the fear of losing one's life before one's time. This fear of death, out of a love for life, is indeed the key to Taoist wisdom. 

Furthermore, also according to the Tao Te Ching (77.4) a wise person acts without claiming the results as his; he achieves his merit and does not rest (arrogantly) in it: – he does not wish to display his superiority.

Wicca

In the numerous traditions of initiatory Wicca, called in the U.S.A. British Traditional Wicca, four paired & balanced qualities are recommended in liturgical texts as having come from the Wiccan Goddess:

In the matter of humility, this deific instruction appropriately pairs being honorable with being humble. Characteristically, this Wiccan "virtue" is balanced by its partner virtue.

Philosophical views of humility

Kant's view of humility has been defined as "that meta-attitude that constitutes the moral agent's proper perspective on himself as a dependent and corrupt but capable and dignified rational agent". Kant's notion of humility relies on the centrality of truth and rational thought leading to proper perspective and can therefore be seen as emergent.

Mahatma Gandhi is attributed as suggesting that attempting to sustain truth without humility is doomed to become an "arrogant caricature" of truth.

While many religions and philosophers view humility as a virtue, some have been critical of it, seeing it as opposed to individualism.

Nietzsche views humility as a strategy used by the weak to avoid being destroyed by the strong.  In Twilight of the Idols he writes: "When stepped on, a worm doubles up. That is clever. In that way he lessens the probability of being stepped on again. In the language of morality:  humility." He believed that his idealized Übermensch would be more apt to roam around unfettered by pretensions of humility, proud of his stature and power, but not reveling idly in it, and certainly not displaying hubris.  But, if so, this would mean the pretension aspect of this kind of humility is more akin to obsequiousness and to other kinds of pretentious humility.

Humility and leadership
Recent research suggests that humility is a quality of certain types of leaders. For example, Jim Collins and his colleagues found that a certain type of leader, whom they term "level 5", possesses humility and fierce resolve. Humility is being studied as a trait that can enhance leadership effectiveness. The research suggests that humility is multi-dimensional and includes self-understanding and awareness, openness, and perspective taking.

Further reading

See also 
 Humiliation
 Humility theology
 Intellectual humility
 Epistemic humility
 Cultural humility
 Madonna of humility
 Moral character
 Pharisee and the Publican
 Aidos, Greek goddess of shame, modesty, and humility.

References

External links

 
 
 
 

Religious ethics
Christian ethics
Philosophy of love
Seven virtues
Fruit of the Holy Spirit
Humility